Eldar Hadzimehmedovic (born 10 September 1984) is a Bosnian-Herzegovinian football player who plays as a striker or as an attacking midfielder. He currently plays for Norwegian side Brumunddal.

Life and career 
He was born in Tuzla, SR Bosnia-Herzegovina, Yugoslavia, and came to Norway at the age of 12. He previously played for Bærum in two periods, Lyn, Strømsgodset, Pors Grenland and Modum FK. Ahead of the 2014 season he went from Raufoss to Brumunddal.

He never made a breakthrough at Lyn, but made a name for himself against NSÍ Runavík in the UEFA Cup qualifying round. In the second leg, the then-18-year-old Hadžimehmedović made the unusual starting eleven, scoring a hat-trick in the first half. He then scored another hat-trick in the first 25 minutes of the second half. Having scored his six goals, he was then substituted in the 70th minute. 6 goals by Eldar Hadzimehmedovic in this game is the most goals scored by a player in one game record in UEFA cup competition, and he currently holds the record for most goals in a match for Lyn, jointly with John Sveinsson.

International career 
Hadzimehmedovic has played for the Bosnia and Herzegovina national under-21 football team and the Under-19.

References

External links
Lyn Profile

1984 births
Living people
Sportspeople from Tuzla
Sportspeople from Bærum
Bosnia and Herzegovina emigrants to Norway
Association football forwards
Bosnia and Herzegovina footballers
Bosnia and Herzegovina under-21 international footballers
Bosnia and Herzegovina youth international footballers
Bærum SK players
Lyn Fotball players
Strømsgodset Toppfotball players
Pors Grenland players
Raufoss IL players
Lørenskog IF players
Eliteserien players
Norwegian First Division players
Norwegian Second Division players
Bosnia and Herzegovina expatriate footballers
Expatriate footballers in Norway
Bosnia and Herzegovina expatriate sportspeople in Norway